Smart Distributed System (SDS) protocol was developed by Honeywell and is supported by Holjeron. SDS is an open event-driven protocol used over Controller area network based industrial networks. It is used for a highly reliable Smart device-level network. The SDS Application Layer Protocol is optimized for smart sensors and actuators, where configuration, diagnostic, and process information can be embedded cost-effectively in a very small footprint.

Key features
 Supports communication rates up to 1 Mbit/s.
 1500 ft maximum distance at 125 kbit/s (longer with Bridge).
 Can support 64 maximum electrical loads (Nodes) per network without repeater & 126 with repeater.
 Uses 12-24VDC, 2 power wires + 2 communication wires + shield
 Multiple physical layer topologies
 Can have 126 logical addresses (logical devices) - not related to physical location on the network
 Each logical device can have 32 objects containing attributes, actions and events
 Proven event driven architecture for maximum throughput (<1ms)
 Event-Driven, Master-Slave, Multicast and Peer-to-peer Services
 Network heartbeat to ensure device health every 2.5 seconds
 Have Robust Network Management capabilities (Microsoft architecture)

External links
 SDS Testing

Industrial computing
Serial buses
Industrial automation